Alexander Lindsay of Evelick (c. 1561 – 1639), was a Church of Scotland minister who rose to be Bishop of Dunkeld.

Life

He was second son of John Lindsay, laird of Evelick. He graduated MA at St Leonard's College, St Andrews, and spent some time as a "regent" (the equivalent of a Fellow of the college.

In October 1591 Lindsay was ordained as minister of St Madoes church in Perthshire. He was elected Constant Moderator in 1606 but served only one year as he was chosen as to be Bishop of Dunkeld on 21 December 1607. On 27 January 1624, he was admitted to the Scottish Privy Council. He assisted in the coronation of King Charles I in 1633.

He was hostile to the introduction of the Book of Common Prayer in 1637 and, contrary to royal policy, favoured a reduced role for bishops. The following year he submitted to the Covenanters and was deprived of his office as Bishop on 24 December 1638. He temporarily lost his ministry of St Madoes but was reinstated in January 1639 having repented publicly at Kilspindie Church. He died in October 1639.

Family

He married twice: firstly to Barbara Bruce (d. August 1626), and had several children

Alexander Lindsay heir to Evelick
William Lindsay of Kilspindie
Catherine married John Lundie of Lundie
Helen married Sir Patrick Hay of Pitfour

Secondly he married Nicholas (sic) Dundas.

References

 Stevenson, David, "Lindsay, Alexander, of Evelick (c. 1561–1639)", in the Oxford Dictionary of National Biography, Oxford University Press, 2004 , Retrieved 19 Feb 2007

1560s births
1639 deaths
Bishops of Dunkeld (Church of Scotland)
Covenanters
Alexander
Members of the Parliament of Scotland 1612
Members of the Convention of the Estates of Scotland 1617
Members of the Parliament of Scotland 1617
Members of the Parliament of Scotland 1621
Members of the Convention of the Estates of Scotland 1625
Members of the Parliament of Scotland 1628–1633
Members of the Convention of the Estates of Scotland 1630